Manuel Gómez Pereira (born 8 December 1958 in Madrid) is a Spanish screenwriter and film director of comedies. His 1999 film Between Your Legs was entered into the 49th Berlin International Film Festival.

He is the nephew of the film director  Luis Sanz, his brother.

Filmography as director 
 1992: Salsa rosa
 1993: Why Do They Call It Love When They Mean Sex?
 1994: Todos los hombres sois iguales
 1995: Boca a boca (Mouth to Mouth)
 1997: Love Can Seriously Damage Your Health (El amor perjudica seriamente la salud) 
 1999: Between Your Legs (Entre las piernas) 
 2001: Off Key (Desafinado)
 2004: ¡Hay motivo! 
 2004: Cosas que hacen que la vida valga la pena
 2006: Queens (Reinas)
 2009: The Hanged Man
 2014: La ignorancia de la sangre

References

External links
 

1958 births
Living people
Spanish male screenwriters
Film directors from Madrid
Writers from Madrid
20th-century Spanish screenwriters
20th-century Spanish male writers
21st-century Spanish screenwriters